Allu Sirish (born 30 May 1987) is an Indian actor who works predominantly in Telugu films. He debuted as a lead actor with Gouravam (2013) and later went to appear in films such as Kotha Janta (2014), Srirastu Subhamastu (2016) and Okka Kshanam (2017).

Career 
Sirish debuted with the Telugu–Tamil bilingual film Gouravam (2013) opposite Yami Gautam, produced by Prakash Raj and directed by Radha Mohan. Though a commercial failure, it managed to have a fair share of reviews from critics for its theme. Kotha Janta (2014), a romantic comedy directed by Maruthi was about two different minded co-workers falling in love and the drama that ensues. It was the 3rd most watched Telugu movie of the year through satellite screening, which is quite a feat for a small budget film. Srirasthu Subhamastu (2016), directed by Parasuram, was a love story with family drama. The film got positive talk from morning shows. It was a hit at the box office and went on to collect  during its run. He was announced as the second lead opposite Mohanlal in 1971: Beyond Borders (2017), directed by Major Ravi, making this his debut in Malayalam. He received good reviews from Behindwoods and Kochi times stating that "Sirish is decent and satisfactory". In 2017, he starred in the film Okka Kshanam, which was a sci-fi thriller based on the concept of parallel lives. The film was critically acclaimed. In 2019, He starred in the film ABCD – American Born Confused Desi, which was a Telugu remake of the Malayalam film with the same name, starring Dulquer Salmaan. The film was a story of a rich spoilt brat who gets kicked out of his house and finds it hard to reform. He was admired for his performance.

Sirish worked with Tamannaah for the Head & Shoulders commercial for the Telugu audience. He was given the "Crossover Star of the Year" award at the Lulu Fashion Awards in 2019 for his Malayalam entry.

His next appearance was in 2022, in the movie Oorvasivo Rakshasivo, opposite to Anu Emmanuel.

Filmography 

 All films are in Telugu, unless otherwise noted.

Music video

Television

References

External links
 
 

Telugu people
Male actors from Chennai
Male actors in Telugu cinema
Indian male film actors
21st-century Indian male actors
Living people
Male actors in Tamil cinema
Male actors in Malayalam cinema
1987 births